Brentford and Chiswick was a constituency 1918 – 1974 centred on the Brentford and Chiswick districts of Middlesex which became parts of west London in 1965.  It returned one member (MP) to the House of Commons of the UK Parliament.

Its electoral outcomes were Conservative except for siding with the Labour Party's victories which returned the Attlee Ministry (in 1945) and Second Wilson Ministry (in 1966).

Boundaries

This former constituency is toward the south-west of the historic county of Middlesex, in what is since 1965 west London. It was established as a division of the county of Middlesex, named after the towns of Brentford and Chiswick. In the 1885–1918 distribution of parliamentary seats it had been the eastern part of the Brentford division.

In 1918 the constituency comprised the Brentford and the Chiswick Urban Districts. In 1927 the two districts were combined to form a single Brentford and Chiswick Urban District, which in 1932 became the Municipal Borough of Brentford and Chiswick. In 1950 the boundaries of the seat were left unchanged, but it was reclassified as a borough constituency.

In 1965 Brentford and Chiswick became part of the London Borough of Hounslow and Greater London.

The seat rapidly became under-sized in electorate, see malapportionment – the area forming the seat was unusually declining in population, with in the 1918 to 1930 period the major loss of servants and lodgers among many of the larger houses particularly in Chiswick, and areas of reduction of overly dense housing in Brentford.  Little space remained in the seat for new building compared with other seats to the west and north.  The rest of the county saw major population growth.  One key area of growth in this seat was instead in the number of commercial plants, yards and offices adjoining the 'Golden Mile', Brentford.

In the redistribution of parliamentary seats, which took effect at the February 1974 general election, this seat was replaced by Brentford and Isleworth which took in the eastern half of abolished Heston and Isleworth.

Members of Parliament

Election results

Elections in the 1910s

Elections in the 1920s

Elections in the 1930s

Elections in the 1940s

Elections in the 1950s

Elections in the 1960s

Elections in the 1970s

References 

 Boundaries of Parliamentary Constituencies 1885–1972, compiled and edited by F.W.S. Craig (Parliamentary Reference Publications 1972)

History of the London Borough of Hounslow
Parliamentary constituencies in London (historic)
Constituencies of the Parliament of the United Kingdom established in 1918
Constituencies of the Parliament of the United Kingdom disestablished in 1974
Politics of the London Borough of Hounslow
Brentford, London
Chiswick
1918 establishments in England
1974 disestablishments in England